Noel Willman (4 August 1918 – 24 December 1988) was an Irish actor and theatre director. Born in Derry, Ireland, Willman died aged 70 in New York City, United States.

Career

Willman's films included The Man Who Knew Too Much (1956), Across the Bridge (1957), Carve Her Name with Pride (1958), The Kiss of the Vampire (1963), Doctor Zhivago (1965), The Reptile (1966), and The Odessa File (1974).

He was also a theatre director and actor, and won a Tony Award in 1962 for his direction of the original Broadway production of Robert Bolt's A Man For All Seasons. According to Bolt, he was instrumental in many aspects of the play's development, including the casting of Paul Scofield as Thomas More. In 1966 he was nominated in the same category for James Goldman's The Lion in Winter. He later directed Katharine Hepburn and Christopher Reeve in A Matter of Gravity in 1976.

He frequently collaborated with Bolt, directing The Tiger and the Horse and Gentle Jack (and appearing in Zhivago, which Bolt scripted). One of his most famous theatrical roles was opposite Alec Guinness in the stage production of Bridget Boland's The Prisoner, for which he won the Clarence Derwent Award, and which was later made into a film, starring Guinness and Jack Hawkins.

Willman studied for the stage at the London Theatre Studio, which had been set up by Michel Saint-Denis and George Devine in 1936. Working as stage manager for John Gielgud's touring production of The Beggar's Opera, he took over the role of Macheath at short notice from Michael Redgrave, who had fallen ill and whose usual understudy had suffered a bout of laryngitis. 

During the war he toured with the Old Vic Company, then directed by Tyrone Guthrie, playing in The Merchant of Venice in 1941, and taking part in several productions at the Vic's Liverpool Playhouse base, including Shaw's Androcles and the Lion. Prompted by Guthrie, he became a director. In 1942, he presented his debut production Ah, Wilderness! by Eugene O'Neill.

Filmography

References

External links
 
 

1918 births
1988 deaths
Alumni of the London Theatre Studio
Irish film actors
Irish male television actors
Actors from Derry (city)
20th-century Irish male actors
Male actors from County Londonderry
Irish expatriates in the United States